Trephionus kinoshitai, is a species of beetle belonging to the family Carabidae. It is endemic to Japan.

Description
Body length of male is about 8.7–10.2 mm, whereas female is 9.0 mm. Head and pronotum black. Elytra blackish brown to black. No hind wings. Dorso-apical lobe semi-ellipsoid. Apex of aedeagus rounded.

References

Beetles described in 1854
Platyninae